Tuğba Güvenç (born 9 July 1994) is a Turkish middle-distance runner. She competed in the 3000 metres steeplechase event at the 2015 World Championships in Athletics in Beijing, China.

In 2017, she competed in the women's 3000 metres steeplechase event at the 2017 World Championships in Athletics held in London, United Kingdom. She did not advance to compete in the final.

Competition record

References

External links
 

1994 births
Living people
Turkish female middle-distance runners
Turkish female steeplechase runners
World Athletics Championships athletes for Turkey
Place of birth missing (living people)
Athletes (track and field) at the 2016 Summer Olympics
Olympic athletes of Turkey
Universiade medalists in athletics (track and field)
Competitors at the 2018 Mediterranean Games
Universiade gold medalists for Turkey
Competitors at the 2019 Summer Universiade
Medalists at the 2017 Summer Universiade
Mediterranean Games competitors for Turkey
20th-century Turkish sportswomen
21st-century Turkish sportswomen
Athletes (track and field) at the 2022 Mediterranean Games